Manuel Alexandre Jamuana, known simply as Jamuana, in an Angolan footballer who plays as a defender. He also represented the Angolan national team at the 2010 Africa Cup of Nations.

Career
Jamuana played for Atlético do Namibe before joining ASA for the second half of the 2013 season.

References

External links

1984 births
Living people
Angolan footballers
Angola international footballers
2010 Africa Cup of Nations players
Atlético Petróleos de Luanda players
Atlético Sport Aviação players
Association football fullbacks